Brionne is a commune in the Eure department. Brionne is in the region of Normandy of northern France.

Population history

Notable sites and buildings
The keep of Brionne was built in the 11th century A.D. and was destroyed in the 18th century. The keep was of a Norman variety because of its square shape.

The church of Saint Martin includes a tower that uses Romanesque and Gothic elements. The ground-level floor of the church is of a Romanesque style while the first-story floor is of a Gothic style. The church's door was made in the 18th century A.D.. The church's altar was designed by Guillaume de la Tremblaye in 1694 A.D.. The altar was originally intended to be used in the Chapel of the Bec Abbey.

The cemetery and the church of Saint Denis were used for religious purposes until 1790 A.D.. The cemetery was used until both the church and the cemetery were damaged by bombs in The 2nd World War (1944). The church was later partially restored but the cemetery ceased to exist. The church now does serve as a gymnasium.

See also
 Communes of the Eure department

References

External links

Official site) (French)
Blog about Brionne (French)
Medieval past of Brionne reveals it at the heart of Normandy's turbulant history - with images English

Communes of Eure